Raja Isteri Pengiran Anak Hajah Saleha Bridge, RIPAS Bridge for short and commonly known as Sungai Kebun Bridge, is a cable-stayed bridge which connects the City Centre and Sungai Kebun in Bandar Seri Begawan, Brunei. It is named after Queen Saleha, the queen consort of the current Sultan of Brunei, Sultan Hassanal Bolkiah. The cable-stayed bridge is the first of its kind in Brunei. It was officially inaugurated on 14 October 2017. It is the second-longest single-pylon cable-stayed bridge in the world.

Design 
The bridge has a total length of 622 metres and the main span is 300 metres long. It is a cable-stayed bridge with one tower which rises to the height of 157 metres. At the top is an Islamic dome with a diameter of 8.7 metres and weight of 9.5 tonnes. The tower has since been the tallest structure in the country. The bridge is also reported to be the second longest single-pylon cable-stayed bridge in the world. On the bridge is a dual-carriageway road with interchanges at both ends, as well as pedestrian sidewalks.

At the base of the tower is a crescent island which resembles that of the Panji-Panji or Emblem of Brunei. On the island there is a small building that has been built, which is slated to be a gallery.

History
The Ministry of Development reached a success to begin the construction of the bridge in June 2013 as part of the 10th National Development Plan. 
The groundbreaking ceremony was held on 16 January 2014, officiated by the Crown Prince Al-Muhtadee Billah. The joint-venture between the South Korean company Daelim Industrial and local Swee constructed the bridge, which took about three years and cost 139 million Brunei dollar ($100M as of October 2017).

The bridge began to open to the public on 2 October 2017 on a trial basis. On the 14th in the same month, it was finally inaugurated in a grand opening ceremony as part of the Golden Jubilee celebration of His Majesty the Sultan, which included fireworks display by Howard & Sons, Hunan Dream Fireworks and Liuyang Intently Fireworks, as well as procession of decorated floats.

References 

Bridges in Brunei
Bridges completed in 2017